Mili is a Japanese indie music group founded in August 2012, consisting of Cassie Wei, Yamato Kasai, Yukihito Mitomo, Shoto Yoshida, and Ao Fujimori. Mili covers electronic classical, contemporary classical, and post-classical genres of music and is not limited to songs in Japanese, but also in English, Chinese, and French. Aside from releasing their own songs, Mili has also contributed their music, lyrics, and/or songs to various media such as the rhythm games Cytus and Deemo, other games like Library of Ruina, Mahoyaku and ENDER LILIES, commercial video, and for other artists. Mili is labeled under Saihate Records; as of October 2019 and announced in April 2020, they have separated from their music management company.

The group's YouTube channel is considered exceptional within the indie world, exceeding 500,000 YouTube subscribers. Three of their released CDs took the first places in Oricon Indies chart, as well as appearing in Summer Sonic for two consecutive years since 2017. The group is named after the Brothers Grimm fairy tale, "Dear Mili."

Members
Mili consists of the following five members:

 Yamato Kasai or HAMO – main composer, main arranger, sub lyricist, guitarist
 Cassie Wei, or momocashew – vocalist, main lyricist. Canadian-Chinese, born in China, raised in Canada, now living in Japan
 Yukihito Mitomo – bassist. Kasai's friend, joined Mili in December 2013
 Shoto Yoshida – drummer. Kasai's friend, joined Mili in December 2013
 Ao Fujimori – illustrator, animator. Joined Mili in September 2014

Former members 

 Ame Yamaguchi – stylist, designer, art director. Joined Mili in May 2014; left in August 2019 to work on personal projects

History and works
The list below does not include any of songs listed on their discography.

2012
Founded (August)
Contributed in Sound On Our Palms -TENORI-ON Compilation- (October 28)
Songs for Cytus (November)
Composed song for "Kaitai no Zōkei" (December)

2013
Music for RICOH's commercial video (September 2)
Music for Yamayuri (September 17)
Song effect for "A lighthouse and a lilium auratum" and "A flower sings" (September 17)
MuNiCa - Cry of Pluto was sent to Tokyo Game Show 2013 for display (September 27)
Songs for Deemo (November 13)
Arranged music for Sakevisual's otome game Backstage Pass (November 30)
Arranged and composed song for voice comic "Gomen ne" (December 13)

2014
Registered to ARTISTCROWD (January 8)
Song for "Ye Hu Ba Zhong Zou+" (March 8)
Music for Toto's Washlet commercial video (June)
Music for Fuji Kyuko's La ville de Gaspard et Lisa (June 26)
Song arrangement for Ferri's 2nd album "∞": "rusty chandelier" and "eternal return" (November 5)

2015
Music for Combi's commercial video "Branding Movie" (January)
Arrangement for DAOKO's 1st album "DAOKO": "Nai Mono Nedari" (March 25)
Arrangement & composition for Astell & Kern's AK100II Kana Hanazawa Edition collaboration song, "Tadoritsuku Basho" (August)

2016
Song for anime Bloodivores, "NENTEN" (October)
Live tour (November 5–12)

2017
Mini live  (May 27, June 11, & June 24)
Performing at Summer Sonic 2017 (August 18)
5th anniversary live tour "Mag Milk All Songs" (September 30, October 1, October 9, & November 11)

2018
Live Tour 2018 "Mommy, Where's My Left Hand Again?" at Osaka (May 19), Nagoya (May 20), Taipei, Taiwan (June 9), Tokyo (June 15), Guangzhou (November 8), Beijing(November 10) and Shanghai (November 11)
Song for television anime series Goblin Slayer, "Rightfully" (October)
Song for television anime series Merc Storia: The Apathetic Boy and the Girl in a Bottle "Origin" and arrangement & composition for its ending theme sung by Inori Minase,  "Bottleship" (October)
 Performed at C3AFA 2018 Singapore (December 2)

2019
双島乳業 presents Mili 1st Live 2019 "Mother Ship Gi6pon" (February 3)
Music in charge for Fuji TV's original drama Yuri Dano Kan Dano (May)
New song, "Sloth" (September)
Guest artist at Anime Festival Asia: I LOVE ANISONG Matsuri Malaysia 2019 (June 8, 9)
Mili Tour 2019-2020: AJIWAIIAJI (December 2019–January 2020)

2020
Song for anime film Goblin Slayer: Goblin's Crown, "Static" (February)
Song for animated webseries Ghost in the Shell: SAC 2045, "sustain++" (February) 
Song for mobile game Mahōtsukai no Yakusoku, "Cast Me a Spell" (April)
Song for television anime series Gleipnir, "Rain, body fluids and smell" (April) 
Music in charge for game Ender Lilies (September)

2021
Album for video game Library of Ruina, "To Kill a Living Book -for Library of Ruina-" (October)
Song for the video game Limbus Company, "In Hell We Live, Lament"(November)

2022
Song for the video game '"Welcome to Dreamland, "Sideshow Duckling" (February)
Opening theme for the uvideo game Thy Creature, "My Creator" (February)
Song for the second part of mobile game Mahōtsukai no Yakusoku, "Skin-Deep Comedy" (March)
Opening theme for the anime adaption of The Executioner and Her Way of Life, "Paper Bouquet" (April)
Ending theme for the anime adaption of Vermeil in Gold'', "Mortal With You" (July)

Discography

Albums

Studio albums

Mini album

Single

Others

References

External links
 
 Mili on YouTube
 

Classical music groups
Musical groups established in 2012
Japanese musicians
2012 establishments in Japan